Fredrik Correa (born 8 February 1977) is a Swedish strength training entrepreneur and competitive powerlifter.

He is the CEO and co-founder of the flywheel training company Exxentric since 2011, gaining customers in 60 countries and winning multiple awards for Swedish growth companies. Since 2018 he has been competing in masters classic powerlifting, finalling 1st–5th in Swedish, European and World championships, and he is a frequent podcast guest, lecturer and interviewee in Europe and the Americas within the field of strength training.

Fredrik Correa has a background as physician from Karolinska Institute in Stockholm specialized in dermatology. Before that, he was a junior ice hockey coach, and earned a B.Sc. in sports science at the Swedish School of Sport and Health Sciences.

References

Living people
1977 births
Swedish powerlifters
Swedish dermatologists
Physicians from Stockholm
Businesspeople from Stockholm
Karolinska Institute alumni
Swedish School of Sport and Health Sciences alumni
People in the strength training industry